Congregation Shaare Emeth is a Reform Jewish congregation in Creve Coeur, Missouri. Founded in St. Louis in 1867, it constructed its first building at 17th and Pine Streets in 1869.

Shaare Emeth is a member of the Union for Reform Judaism. It is the oldest Reform and largest congregation in the greater St. Louis area. In addition to religious services, the Shaare Emeth has a religious school, Shirlee Green Preschool, and two summer camps, Camp Micah and Camp Emeth. Clergy are Senior Rabbi Jim Bennett, Rabbi Andrea Goldstein, Rabbi Rachel Bearman, Cantor Seth Warner, and Rabbi Educator Lori Levine; Rabbi Emeritus is Jeffrey Stiffman.

References

External links 
 Congregational web page

Reform synagogues in Missouri
Religious organizations established in 1867
Religious buildings and structures in Missouri
1867 establishments in Missouri
Synagogues completed in 1867